The Autovía A-50 (also known as Autovía Ávila - Salamanca and Autovía de la Cultura) is an autovía in the community of Castile and León, Spain. It starts at the Autovía A-51 at Ávila and ends on the southern outskirts of Salamanca, close to the Autovía A-62 and the Autovía A-66, while running parallel to the N-501 road. It was built between 2006 and 2009.

A-50
A-50